Semiramide riconosciuta (Semiramis recognized or revealed) is an opera libretto by Pietro Metastasio (1698–1782), written in 1729. It is for opera seria, and accordingly consists of recitatives and da capo arias. It tells a story of the legendary Semiramis, wife of the Biblical Nimrod.

Characters
The voice types and character descriptions are taken from the text set to music in 1729 by Leonardo Vinci:
 Semiramide (soprano), Assyrian queen, in masculine dress under the name Nimrod; in love with Scitalce, who had previously known her in Egypt under the name Idreno
 Mirteo (soprano), Egyptian prince, brother of Semiramis (though he does not know this), in love with Tamiri
 Ircano (contralto), Scythian prince, in love with Tamiri
 Scitalce (contralto), Indian prince, in love with Semiramide
 Tamiri (soprano), Bactrian princess, in love with Scitalce
 Sibari (tenor), confidante of and secretly in love with Semiramide

Plot

Operas
The libretto has been used as the text for operas by several composers, including:

 Semiramide riconosciuta by Leonardo Vinci, premiered 6 February 1729
 Semiramide riconosciuta by Nicola Porpora, premiered 26 December 1729
 Semiramide riconosciuta by Niccolò Jommelli, premiered 1741
 Semiramide riconosciuta by Giovanni Battista Lampugnani, premiered 1741
 Semiramide riconosciuta by Johann Adolph Hasse, premiered 26 December 1744
 La Semiramide riconosciuta by Domènec Terradellas, premiered 1746
 La Semiramide riconosciuta by Christoph Willibald Gluck, premiered 1748
 La Semiramide riconosciuta by Baldassare Galuppi, premiered 1749
 La Semiramide riconosciuta by Giovanni Marco Rutini, premiered 1752
 Semiramide riconosciuta by Gioacchino Cocchi, premiered 1753
 Semiramide riconosciuta by Andrea Bernasconi, premiered 1765
 Semiramide by Josef Mysliveček, premiered 1766, Bergamo
 Semiramide by Antonio Salieri, premiered 1782
 Semiramide riconosciuta by Giacomo Meyerbeer, premiered 1819

References

Opera libretti
1729 in music